Samuel Chimerenka Chukwueze (born 22 May 1999) is a Nigerian professional footballer who plays as a winger for La Liga club Villarreal and the Nigeria national team.

Early life and education 
Chukwueze was born in Umuahia, Abia state. He is of Igbo descent and was brought up in a Christian family with a younger brother and a younger sister. He attended Government College Umuahia and Evangel Secondary School. He started playing football at the age of 8 and he admired Jay-Jay Okocha as his football idol growing up. He has been mentored by Hon. Victor Apugo whom he saw as a father, as stated in his earlier interview.

Club career
Born in Amaokwe Ugba Ibeku, Umuahia, Abia State, Chukwueze joined Villarreal CF's prolific youth setup in 2017, from local side Diamond Football Academy. After being initially assigned to the club's Juvenil A squad, he made his senior debut with the reserves on 15 April 2018, coming on as a second-half substitute for Sergio Lozano in a 1–1 Segunda División B away draw against CE Sabadell FC.

Chukwueze scored his first senior goal on 20 May 2018, netting his team's second in a 3–1 away defeat of Bilbao Athletic. He contributed with two goals in 11 appearances during his first season, as his side missed out promotion in the play-offs.

Chukwueze made his first-team debut on 20 September 2018, replacing Nicola Sansone in a 2–2 home draw against Rangers, for the 2018–19 UEFA Europa League. He also made his league debut on 5 November 2018, playing a 90-minute full play in a 1–1 home draw against Levante, for the 2018–19 La Liga.

In April 2019, he won the Nigeria Football Federation's 2018 Young Player of the Year award.

On 12 April 2022, in the second leg of the 2021–22 UEFA Champions League quarter-final away to Bayern Munich, Chukwueze scored the equaliser for 1–1 in the 88th minute, helping Villarreal progress to the semi-finals of the tournament.

International career
After playing for Nigeria at under-17 level, he received his first call-up to the senior team in October 2018. He made his debut for the Nigerian senior team on 20 November 2018 as a starter in a 0–0 friendly draw against Uganda.

In May 2019, Chukwueze was invited to represent Nigeria's senior team at the Africa Cup of Nations and the Under-20 team at the Under-20 World Cup. However, Villarreal said he could only play in one of the tournaments. He ultimately decided to take part with Nigerian's senior squad for Africa Cup of Nations hosted in Egypt and scored his first senior goal in Nigeria's 2–1 win over South Africa in the quarter finals.

Career statistics

Club

International

Scores and results list Nigeria's goal tally first, score column indicates score after each Chukwueze goal.

Honours
Villarreal
 UEFA Europa League: 2020–21

Nigeria U17
 FIFA U-17 World Cup: 2015

Individual
FIFA U-17 World Cup: Bronze Boot: 2015
 DFA Most Influential Player of the Year: 2016
 MCL Cup Most Valuable Player: 2016

References

External links

Profile at the Villarreal CF website

1999 births
Living people
People from Abia State
Nigerian footballers
Association football wingers
La Liga players
Segunda División B players
Villarreal CF B players
Villarreal CF players
Nigeria youth international footballers
Nigeria international footballers
Nigerian expatriate footballers
Nigerian expatriate sportspeople in Spain
Expatriate footballers in Spain
Government College Umuahia alumni
2019 Africa Cup of Nations players
2021 Africa Cup of Nations players
UEFA Europa League winning players